Malka Moma (A Young Girl) is a Bulgarian song written in folk style.  The words were written by Neli Andreeva, who is originally from the Rodopi region of Bulgaria; and the music was written by Neli Andreeva and Georgi Genov.

Lyrics

See also
Music of Bulgaria

References

Bulgarian folk songs
Songs about rivers